James Beard (James Andrews Beard, 1903–1985) was an American chef and food writer.

James Beard may also refer to:

 James Henry Beard (1814–1893), American painter
 James Beard (architect) (James Albert "Jim" Beard, 1924–2017), New Zealand architect
 Jim Beard (James Arthur Beard, born 1960), American musician
 James B. Beard (1935–2018), American agronomist